Lesnovka is a rural locality in Verkhnelyubazhsky Selsoviet Rural Settlement, Fatezhsky District, Kursk Oblast, Russia. Population:

References

Notes

Sources

Rural localities in Fatezhsky District